Mazeley is a commune in the Vosges department in Grand Est in northeastern France.

Geography

History
Several archaeological discoveries indicate that the area was occupied in Roman times.  A section of paved roadway was unearthed in the local woods in 1861, followed in 1988 by the discovery of a Gallo-Roman road in the Chanot district.  Also discovered in 1988 an old road visible over more than a kilometre in an area called Donzey Wood (Bois de Donzey) heading in the direction of Gigney

Points of interest
 Arboretum de Mazeley

See also
Communes of the Vosges department

References

Communes of Vosges (department)